Prostate Cancer UK is a prostate cancer research, awareness and support organisation which is a registered charity in England and Wales, as well as in Scotland.

History 
The organisation was founded in 1996 as The Prostate Cancer Charity by Professor Jonathan Waxman. The charity merged with Prostate Action in 2012 to form the current organisation.

As of 2021, EDF Energy is currently in a partnership with the charity, which will run until December 2022.

Work 
In 2021, the charity funded a study investigating why black men are twice as likely as other men to develop prostate cancer. The charity also launched its Clinical Champions program, where the charity provides funding and training to selected people.

References 

Men's health
Prostate cancer
Charities based in the United Kingdom